Center Peak is a  mountain summit located one mile west of the crest of the Sierra Nevada mountain range, in the northeast corner of Tulare County in northern California. The John Muir Trail which traverses below the west slope of this remote peak provides an approach.

History
Cornelius Beach Bradley and Robert M. Price, each of the Sierra Club, named it in 1898 when Bradley made the first ascent: "Two of these promontories, standing guard, as it were, the one at the entrance to the valley and the other just within it, form a striking pair, and we named them the Videttes. A third, standing more detached, and in the very center of the mighty cirque at the head of the valley, we named Center Peak." The north face was first climbed by David Brower and Hervey Voge on May 22, 1934. The  Northwest Arête is considered one of the classic climbing routes in the Sierra Nevada, and was first climbed in 1983 by Claude Fiddler and Vern Clevenger.

Climate
According to the Köppen climate classification system, Center Peak is located in an alpine climate zone. Most weather fronts originate in the Pacific Ocean, and travel east toward the Sierra Nevada mountains. As fronts approach, they are forced upward by the peaks, causing them to drop their moisture in the form of rain or snowfall onto the range (orographic lift). Precipitation runoff from the mountain drains into headwaters of Bubbs Creek, a tributary of the South Fork Kings River.

See also

 List of mountain peaks of California

References

External links

 Weather forecast: Center Peak
 Center Peak photo: Flickr

Mountains of Tulare County, California
Mountains of Kings Canyon National Park
North American 3000 m summits
Mountains of Northern California
Sierra Nevada (United States)